In Ohio, State Route 74 may refer to:
Interstate 74 in Ohio, the only Ohio highway numbered 74 since about 1962
Ohio State Route 74 (1923), now SR 32